Wirgman is a surname. Notable people with the surname include:

Charles Wirgman (1832–1891), English artist and cartoonist
Charles Wirgman (sport shooter) (1875–1953), British sports shooter
George Wirgman Hemming (1821–1905), English law reporter and barrister
Theodore Blake Wirgman (1848–1925), English painter

See also
Wirgman Building, was an early 19th-century Federal-style commercial and residential building located on East Main Street (U.S. Route 50) in Romney

References